is a temple of the Nichiren-shū founded during the Kamakura period in Ichikawa, Chiba Prefecture, Japan. One of Nichiren's most important writings the Risshō Ankoku Ron, regarded as one of the National Treasures of Japan, is kept at the temple. Next to other documents it is being presented to the public on 3 November each year.

Buildings
 Shisoku-mon (Sengoku period) (Important Cultural Property)
 Hokkedō (Sengoku period) (ICP)
 Five-storey pagoda (1622) (ICP)
 Soshidō (1678) (ICP)

Restoration of the Soshidō
It was understood that originally the building resembled the Honden-Haiden of Kibitsu Jinja and, after an inscription was founded by the master carpenter of 1678 who came from that area, the hall was remodelled on that basis. A wooden shingle roof was installed and the old copper sold off for use by sculptors.

See also
 Kibitsu Jinja

References

External links
  Hokekyō-ji homepage

Nichiren-shū temples
Buddhist temples in Ichikawa, Chiba